Lakshmi Manmohan is an Indian playback singer who predominantly works in Kannada movie industry.

Discography

Awards and honours
She won Karnataka State Film Award for Best Female Playback Singer for Gandhi Smile in 2010–11.

References

Year of birth missing (living people)
Living people
Indian women playback singers
Kannada playback singers